The 1996 United States presidential election in Wisconsin took place on November 5, 1996, as part of the 1996 United States presidential election. Voters chose 11 representatives, or electors to the Electoral College, who voted for president and vice president.

Wisconsin was won by President Bill Clinton (D) over Senator Bob Dole (R-KS), with Clinton winning by 48.81% to 38.48%, or a margin of 10.33%. Billionaire businessman Ross Perot (Reform Party of the United States of America-TX) finished in third, with 10.35% of the popular vote. , this is the last election in which the following counties have voted for a Democratic presidential candidate: Polk, St. Croix, Sheboygan, and Taylor.

Results

Results by county

See also
 United States presidential elections in Wisconsin

References

Wisconsin
1996
1996 Wisconsin elections